Ballast water discharges by ships can have a negative impact on the marine environment. The discharge of ballast water and sediments by ships is governed globally under the Ballast Water Management Convention, since its entry into force in September 2017. It is also controlled through national regulations, which may be separate from the Convention, such as in the United States.

Cruise ships, large tankers, and bulk cargo carriers use a huge amount of ballast water, which is often taken on in the coastal waters in one region after ships discharge wastewater or unload cargo, and discharged at the next port of call, wherever more cargo is loaded. Ballast water discharge typically contains a variety of biological materials, including plants, animals, viruses, and bacteria. These materials often include non-native, nuisance, exotic species that can cause extensive ecological and economic damage to aquatic ecosystems, along with serious human health issues including death.

Problematic species

There are hundreds of organisms carried in ballast water that cause problematic ecological effects outside of their natural range. The International Maritime Organization (IMO) lists the ten most unwanted species as:
Cholera Vibrio cholerae (various strains)
Cladoceran Water Flea Cercopagis pengoi
Mitten Crab Eriocheir sinensis
Toxic algae (red/brown/green tides) (various species)
Round Goby Neogobius melanostomus
North American Comb Jelly Mnemiopsis leidyi
North Pacific Seastar Asterias amurensis
Zebra Mussel Dreissena polymorpha
Asian Kelp Undaria pinnatifida
European Green Crab Carcinus maenas

Other problematic species include:

Spiny Water Flea Bythotrephes longimanus

Ballast water issues by country

New Zealand
The ballast tanks in New Zealand carry animals and plants that kill ecosystems. Ballast tanks are only used in cargo ships there. Ballast water is controlled under the Biosecurity Act 1993.

Peru
A form of cholera, Vibrio cholerae, previously reported only in Bangladesh apparently arrived via ballast water in Peru in 1991, killing more than 10,000 people over the following three years.

United States

The zebra mussel, which is native to the Caspian and Black Seas, arrived in Lake St. Clair in the ballast water of a transatlantic freighter in 1988. Within 10 years it had spread to all of the five neighbouring Great Lakes. The economic cost of this introduction has been estimated by the U.S. Fish and Wildlife Service at about $5 billion.

Ballast water discharges are believed to be the leading source of invasive species in U.S. marine waters, thus posing public health and environmental risks, as well as significant economic cost to industries such as water and power utilities, commercial and recreational fisheries, agriculture, and tourism. Studies suggest that the economic cost just from introduction of pest mollusks (zebra mussels, the Asian clam, and others) to U.S. aquatic ecosystems is more than $6 billion per year.

Congress passed the National Invasive Species Act in 1996 in order to regulate ballast water discharges. The Coast Guard issued ballast water regulations in 2012. Under the authority of the Clean Water Act, the Environmental Protection Agency (EPA) published its latest Vessel General Permit in 2013. The permit sets numeric ballast water discharge limits for commercial vessels  in length or greater. EPA issued a separate permit for smaller commercial vessels in 2014.

Singapore
Among 818 ports in the Pacific region, Singapore alone accounts for an estimated of 26 percent of cross-region (long range) species exchange. Via targeted ballast management on Singapore and a few other "influential" ports, cross-region species exchange to/from the Pacific region can be combinatorially reduced.

IMO convention

To react to the growing concerns about environmental impact of ballast water discharge, the International Maritime Organization (IMO) adopted in 2004 the "International Convention for the Control and Management of Ships' Ballast Water and Sediments" to control the environmental damage from ballast water.
The Convention will require all ships to implement a "Ballast water management plan" including a ballast water record book and carrying out ballast water management procedures to a given standard.
Guidelines are given for additional measures then the guidelines.

The goals of the convention are to minimise damage to the environment by:
 Minimise the uptake of organisms during ballasting.
 Minimising the uptake of sediments during ballasting.
 Ballast water exchange while at sea (the ship should be minimum 200 nautical miles from shore with a depth of minimum 200 metres and can use the flow through or sequential method). At least 95 percent of the total ballast water should be exchanged.
 Treatment of the ballast water by chemical or mechanical influences (UV-radiation, filter, deoxygenation, cavitation, ozone…)

Control measures include:
 International Ballast Water Management Certificate
 Ballast water management plan
 Ballast water record book

The IMO convention was ratified by enough countries and entered into force on September 8, 2017.

See also
Environmental issues with shipping
Marine pollution

References

 Buck, Eugene H.(2012). "Ballast Water Management to Combat Invasive Species." ´U.S. Congressional Research Service.  Report No. RL32344.

External links
GloBallast partnership (IMO)
International Convention for the Control and Management of Ships' Ballast Water and Sediments (BWM) (IMO)

Ocean pollution
Environmental impact of shipping

de:Ballastwasser-Übereinkommen
no:Ballastvann